Bucculatrix pyrivorella (pear leaf miner) is a moth of the family Bucculatricidae. It is found in Japan (on the islands of Hokkaido, Honshu, Shikoku and Kyushu), the Korean Peninsula and the Russian Far East. It was described in 1964 by Hiroshi Kuroko.

The wingspan is 7-7.5 mm. There are four generations per year.

The larvae feed on Pyrus pyrifolia and Malus species. They mine the leaves of their host plant. It is considered a pest on pear trees.

References

External links
Revisional Studies On The Family Lyonetiidae Of Japan (Lepidoptera)
Ecological Studies on the Population of the Pear Leaf Miner, Bucculatrix pyrivorella Kuroko (Lepidoptera : Lyonetiidae): III. Fecundity Fluctuation from Generation to Generation within a Year

Bucculatricidae
Leaf miners
Moths of Japan
Moths described in 1964
Moths of Asia